The 2008 Yingjiang earthquakes were a series of major earthquakes ranging from surface wave magnitude (Ms) 4.1 to 5.9 that struck Yingjiang County, Yunnan province, China between August 19 (in UTC; August 20 local time) and September 3.  It caused 5 deaths, 130 injuries (21 of which were serious), and RMB 2.7 billion in direct economic damage. USGS put the magnitude of the strongest one to Mw 6.0.

Earthquake

According to the China Earthquake Administration (CEA) and its subordinate China Earthquake Network Center (CENC), a Ms 5.0 earthquake struck Yingjiang County, Yunnan province, China on August 20, 2008 at 05:35:09 China Standard Time (CST – 2135 UTC, August 19, 2008).  A CEA report published on September 17 described two additional strong quakes of Ms 4.9 and Ms 5.9 in the same area the following day; CENC's data base, on the other hand, did not include the earthquake of Ms 4.9 at 20:20 CST on August 21 as the CEA report described, but reveals additional ones after the date.

Sequence of earthquakes

Note: Earthquakes #4 and after are not included in CEA summary; earthquake #2 is unaccounted for in CENC data base.

Impact

Casualties
According to CEA, these earthquakes caused 5 deaths and 21 others were seriously hurt, as well as 109 minor injuries.  Through the Yunnan Earthquake Administration (YNEA), the provincial government invoked Level IV emergence response protocol in the relief. The amount of affected people is said to be around 210,000, roughly 2/3 of the total population in the affected areas.  Direct financial damage amounted to RMB 1.3 billion.  In addition to building damage, the heaviest infrastructure damage occurred to water resources facilities.

Intensity
On the seismic intensity map published by CEA, maximum intensity of these earthquakes reached liedu VIII on China Seismic Intensity Scale (CSIS), which is somewhat equivalent to VIII (Severe) on the MMI and from which CSIS drew reference.  Liedu-VIII zone spans 26 km2 near the epicenter.  Total area of liedu VI (Slightly damaging) and above is a north-south oval of 4,511 km2.

See also
List of earthquakes in 2008
List of earthquakes in Myanmar
List of earthquakes in China
List of earthquakes in Yunnan

References

External links

2008 Yingjiang
Earthquakes in Myanmar
Yingjiang earthquakes
Yingjiang, China
August 2008 events in China
Earthquake clusters, swarms, and sequences
Geography of Dehong Dai and Jingpo Autonomous Prefecture